Francis Milton Kornet (born January 27, 1967) is an American former professional basketball player who was selected by the Milwaukee Bucks in the second round (30th overall) of the 1989 NBA draft. Kornet played two seasons in the NBA, both with the Bucks. In his NBA career, he appeared in a total of 89 games and averaged 1.9 ppg. He graduated from Lexington Catholic High School and played collegiately at Vanderbilt University from 1985 to 1989, and was named all-Southeastern Conference in his senior year.

Kornet's son Luke followed in his father's footsteps to Vanderbilt, signing with the school in 2013.

NBA career statistics

Regular season

|-
| align="left" | 1989–90
| align="left" | Milwaukee
| 57 || 0 || 7.7 || .368 || .250 || .615 || 1.2 || 0.4 || 0.2 || 0.1 || 2.0
|-
| align="left" | 1990–91
| align="left" | Milwaukee
| 32 || 0 || 4.9 || .371 || .278 || .538 || 0.8 || 0.3 || 0.2 || 0.0 || 1.8
|- class="sortbottom"
| style="text-align:center;" colspan="2"| Career
| 89 || 0 || 6.7 || .369 || .263 || .596 || 1.1 || 0.3 || 0.2 || 0.0 || 1.9
|}

Playoffs

|-
| align="left" | 1989–90
| align="left" | Milwaukee
| 2 || 0 || 2.0 || .000 || .000 || .000 || 0.5 || 0.0 || 0.0 || 0.0 || 0.0
|}

References

External links
Basketballreference.com page

1967 births
Living people
American expatriate basketball people in Italy
American men's basketball players
Basketball players from Lexington, Kentucky
Fort Wayne Fury players
Lexington Catholic High School alumni
Mens Sana Basket players
Milwaukee Bucks draft picks
Milwaukee Bucks players
Power forwards (basketball)
Rochester Renegade players
Vanderbilt Commodores men's basketball players
Viola Reggio Calabria players